Johan Viktor Arvidsson (born 8 April 1993) is a Swedish professional ice hockey player for the Los Angeles Kings of the National Hockey League (NHL). He was selected by the Nashville Predators in the fourth round, 112th overall, at the 2014 NHL Entry Draft.

Playing career
Arvidsson previously played in his native Sweden, winning the Swedish Championship twice with Skellefteå AIK in the Swedish Hockey League (SHL). On 15 July 2014, Arvidsson signed a three-year, entry-level contract with the Predators.

On 20 March 2015, the Predators recalled Arvidsson from the Milwaukee Admirals of the American Hockey League (AHL) under emergency conditions, after Colin Wilson suffered a lower-body injury in practice on 19 March 2015. Arvidsson made his NHL debut on 21 March 2015, playing 12 minutes and 52 seconds and recording three shots on goal, one hit and one takeaway in a 3–0 win over the Buffalo Sabres.

On 8 October 2015, Arvidsson scored his first NHL goal, against Cam Ward of the Carolina Hurricanes, a goal that eventually proved to be the game-winner. Arvidsson scored his first career Stanley Cup playoff goal on 9 May 2016 in overtime of Game 6 of the Western Conference Semi-finals against the San Jose Sharks to force the series to a deciding Game 7, which the Predators ultimately lost.

During his breakout 2016–17 season, Arvidsson scored his first career hat-trick, including a short-handed marker, in a 7–4 loss to the Florida Panthers on 11 February 2017. He finished the season with 31 goals and 30 assists for a total of 61 points, which tied him with Ryan Johansen as the Predators' leading scorers.

On 22 July 2017, the Predators re-signed Arvidsson to a seven-year, $29.75 million contract with an annual average of $4.25 million, avoiding arbitration. He also switched his jersey number from #38 to #33. On 16 January 2018, Arvidsson was placed on injured reserve to recover from a lower-body injury, but was activated from it after only missing two games. He ended the regular season tying his career high in points with 61 to help the Predators qualify for the 2018 Stanley Cup playoffs.

Although Arvidsson was named to the Predators opening night roster prior to the beginning of the 2018–19 NHL season, he only played in 58 of 82 regular season games due to injuries. On 12 November 2018, Arvidsson was placed on injured reserve to recover from a broken thumb suffered during a game against the Dallas Stars. He returned to the Predators lineup on 21 December after missing 12 games. He later recorded his second career hat trick in a 7–2 win over the Washington Capitals on 15 January 2019. On 6 April 2019, Arvidsson set the single-season scoring record for the Nashville Predators when he scored his 34th goal of the season against the Chicago Blackhawks in a 5–2 victory in Nashville.

During the 2019–20 season, Arvidsson was injured during a game against the St. Louis Blues due to Robert Bortuzzo repeatedly cross-checking him. He was expected to miss four to six weeks in order to recover from the lower-body injury. When the Predators met the Blues again on 15 February, Bortuzzo fought twice during the game, with Arvidsson and Jarred Tinordi, as the team won 4–3.

In the 2020–21 season, on 8 April 2021, on his 28th birthday, Arvidsson scored his third career hat trick during a 7–1 win against the Detroit Red Wings, with his third goal of the game coming on a penalty shot.

Following his seventh season with the Predators, on 1 July 2021, Arvidsson was traded to the Los Angeles Kings in exchange for a 2021 second-round pick and a 2022 third-round pick. In his first season with the Kings, Arvidsson became the fastest player in his first season with the team to score 20 points since Mike Richards did so in 2011.

Career statistics

Regular season and playoffs

International

References

External links
 

1993 births
Living people
Los Angeles Kings players
Milwaukee Admirals players
Nashville Predators draft picks
Nashville Predators players
People from Skellefteå Municipality
Skellefteå AIK players
Swedish ice hockey right wingers
Sportspeople from Västerbotten County